Ceve (Iceve), or Iceve-Maci, is a Tivoid language of the Cameroons. The divergent dialects are Ceve proper (Becheve), and Maci (Matchi, Oliti).

Writing system

References

Languages of Nigeria
Languages of Cameroon
Tivoid languages